Tomhead Mountain is a summit in the U.S. state of California.

Variant names have been "Tom's Head" and "Toms Head". According to tradition, Tomhead Mountain was so named due to resemblance it shares with the profile of the early settler "Tom's" head.

See also
South Fire

References

Mountains of Tehama County, California